This is a list of the bird species recorded in Barbados. The avifauna of Barbados included a total of 276 species, according to Bird Checklists of the World as of July 2022.  Of them, one is endemic, 15 have been introduced by humans, and 184 are rare or accidental. Eight species have been extirpated and one is probably extinct.

This list is presented in the taxonomic sequence of the Check-list of North and Middle American Birds, 7th edition through the 63rd Supplement, published by the American Ornithological Society (AOS). Common and scientific names are also those of the Check-list, except that the common names of families are from the Clements taxonomy because the AOS list does not include them.

The following tags have been used to highlight several categories of occurrence.

 (A) Accidental - a species that rarely or accidentally occurs in Barbados
 (E) Endemic - a species endemic to Barbados
 (I) Introduced - a species introduced by humans either directly to Barbados or elsewhere in the New World
 (Ex) Extirpated - a species that no longer occurs in Barbados although populations exist elsewhere

Ducks, geese, and waterfowl
Order: AnseriformesFamily: Anatidae

Anatidae includes the ducks and most duck-like waterfowl, such as geese and swans. These birds are adapted to an aquatic existence with webbed feet, flattened bills, and feathers that are excellent at shedding water due to an oily coating.

White-faced whistling-duck, Dendrocygna viduata (A)
Black-bellied whistling-duck, Dendrocygna autumnalis
West Indian whistling-duck, Dendrocygna arborea (A)
Fulvous whistling-duck, Dendrocygna bicolor
Brant, Branta bernicla (A)
Orinoco goose, Neochen jubata (A)
Common shelduck, Tadorna tadorna (A)
Muscovy duck, Cairina moschata
Wood duck, Aix sponsa (I)
Garganey, Spatula querquedula (A)
Blue-winged teal, Spatula discors
Northern shoveler, Spatula clypeata (A)
Eurasian wigeon, Mareca penelope (A)
American wigeon, Mareca americana (A)
Mallard, Anas platyrhynchos (I)
White-cheeked pintail, Anas bahamensis (A)
Northern pintail, Anas acuta (A)
Green-winged teal, Anas crecca (A)
Common pochard, Aythya ferina (A)
Ring-necked duck, Aythya collaris (A)
Tufted duck, Aythya fuligula (A)
Greater scaup, Aythya marila (A)
Lesser scaup, Aythya affinis (A)
Hooded merganser, Lophodytes cucullatus (A)
Masked duck, Nomonyx dominicus
Ruddy duck, Oxyura jamaicensis (I)

New World quail
Order: GalliformesFamily: Odontophoridae

The New World quails are small, plump terrestrial birds only distantly related to the quails of the Old World, but named for their similar appearance and habits.

Northern bobwhite, Colinus virginianus (I) (Ex)

Pheasants, grouse, and allies
Order: GalliformesFamily: Phasianidae

The Phasianidae are a family of terrestrial birds which consists of quails, partridges, snowcocks, francolins, spurfowls, tragopans, monals, pheasants, peafowls, and jungle fowls. In general, they are plump (although they vary in size) and have broad, relatively short wings.

Red junglefowl, Gallus gallus (I)

Flamingos
Order: PhoenicopteriformesFamily: Phoenicopteridae

Flamingos filter-feed on shellfish and algae. Their oddly shaped beaks are specially adapted to separate mud and silt from the food they consume and, uniquely, are used upside-down.

American flamingo, Phoenicopterus ruber (A)

Grebes
Order: PodicipediformesFamily: Podicipedidae

Grebes are small to medium-large freshwater diving birds. They have lobed toes and are excellent swimmers and divers. However, they have their feet placed far back on the body, making them quite ungainly on land.

Pied-billed grebe, Podilymbus podiceps

Pigeons and doves
Order: ColumbiformesFamily: Columbidae

Pigeons and doves are stout-bodied birds with short necks and short slender bills with a fleshy cere.

Rock pigeon, Columba livia (I)
Scaly-naped pigeon, Patagioenas squamosa
White-crowned pigeon, Patagioenas leucocephala (A)
Eurasian collared-dove, Streptopelia decaocto (I)
African collared-dove, Streptopelia roseogrisea (I)
Common ground dove, Columbina passerina
White-winged dove, Zenaida asiatica (A)
Zenaida dove, Zenaida aurita
Eared dove, Zenaida auriculata

Cuckoos
Order: CuculiformesFamily: Cuculidae

The family Cuculidae includes cuckoos, roadrunners, and anis. These birds are of variable size with slender bodies, long tails, and strong legs. The Old World cuckoos are brood parasites.

Greater ani, Crotophaga major (A)
Smooth-billed ani, Crotophaga ani (A)
Common cuckoo, Cuculus canorus (A)
Yellow-billed cuckoo, Coccyzus americanus (A)
Mangrove cuckoo, Coccyzus minor
Black-billed cuckoo, Coccyzus erythropthalmus (A)

Nightjars and allies
Order: CaprimulgiformesFamily: Caprimulgidae

Nightjars are medium-sized nocturnal birds that usually nest on the ground. They have long wings, short legs, and very short bills. Most have small feet, of little use for walking, and long pointed wings. Their soft plumage is camouflaged to resemble bark or leaves.

Common nighthawk, Chordeiles minor
Antillean nighthawk, Chordeiles gundlachii (A)

Swifts
Order: ApodiformesFamily: Apodidae

Swifts are small birds which spend the majority of their lives flying. These birds have very short legs and never settle voluntarily on the ground, perching instead only on vertical surfaces. Many swifts have long swept-back wings which resemble a crescent or boomerang.

Black swift, Cypseloides niger
White-collared swift, Streptoprocne zonaris (A)
Chimney swift, Chaetura pelagica
Short-tailed swift, Chaetura brachyura (A)
Alpine swift, Tachymarptis melba (A)

Hummingbirds
Order: ApodiformesFamily: Trochilidae

Hummingbirds are small birds capable of hovering in mid-air due to the rapid flapping of their wings. They are the only birds that can fly backwards.

Purple-throated carib, Eulampis jugularis (A)
Green-throated carib, Eulampis holosericeus
Antillean crested hummingbird, Orthorhyncus cristatus

Rails, gallinules, and coots
Order: GruiformesFamily: Rallidae

Rallidae is a large family of small to medium-sized birds which includes the rails, crakes, coots, and gallinules. Typically they inhabit dense vegetation in damp environments near lakes, swamps, or rivers. In general they are shy and secretive birds, making them difficult to observe. Most species have strong legs and long toes which are well adapted to soft uneven surfaces. They tend to have short, rounded wings and to be weak fliers.

Sora, Porzana carolina
Common gallinule, Gallinula galeata
American coot, Fulica americana
Purple gallinule, Porphyrio martinica (A)

Thick-knees
Order: CharadriiformesFamily: Burhinidae

The thick-knees are a group of waders found worldwide within the tropical zone, with some species also breeding in temperate Europe and Australia. They are medium to large waders with strong black or yellow-black bills, large yellow eyes and cryptic plumage. Despite being classed as waders, most species have a preference for arid or semi-arid habitats.

Double-striped thick-knee, Burhinus bistriatus (A)

Stilts and avocets
Order: CharadriiformesFamily: Recurvirostridae

Recurvirostridae is a family of large wading birds which includes the avocets and stilts. The avocets have long legs and long up-curved bills. The stilts have extremely long legs and long, thin, straight bills.

Black-necked stilt, Himantopus mexicanus (A)
American avocet, Recurvirostra americana (A)

Oystercatchers
Order: CharadriiformesFamily: Haematopodidae

The oystercatchers are large and noisy plover-like birds, with strong bills used for smashing or prising open molluscs.

American oystercatcher, Haematopus palliatus (A)

Plovers and lapwings
Order: CharadriiformesFamily: Charadriidae

The family Charadriidae includes the plovers, dotterels, and lapwings. They are small to medium-sized birds with compact bodies, short thick necks, and long, usually pointed, wings. They are found in open country worldwide, mostly in habitats near water.

Northern lapwing, Vanellus vanellus (A)
Southern lapwing, Vanellus chilensis
Black-bellied plover, Pluvialis squatarola
American golden-plover, Pluvialis dominica
Pacific golden-plover, Pluvialis fulva (A)
Killdeer, Charadrius vociferus (A)
Common ringed plover, Charadrius hiaticula (A)
Semipalmated plover, Charadrius semipalmatus
Piping plover, Charadrius melodus (A)
Wilson's plover, Charadrius wilsonia (A)
Collared plover, Charadrius collaris (A)
Snowy plover, Charadrius nivosus (A)

Sandpipers and allies
Order: CharadriiformesFamily: Scolopacidae

Scolopacidae is a large diverse family of small to medium-sized shorebirds including the sandpipers, curlews, godwits, shanks, tattlers, woodcocks, snipes, dowitchers, and phalaropes. The majority of these species eat small invertebrates picked out of the mud or soil. Variation in length of legs and bills enables multiple species to feed in the same habitat, particularly on the coast, without direct competition for food.

Upland sandpiper, Bartramia longicauda (A)
Whimbrel, Numenius phaeopus (A)
Eskimo curlew, Numenius borealis (A) (probably extinct)
Long-billed curlew, Numenius americanus (A)
Hudsonian godwit, Limosa haemastica (A)
Marbled godwit, Limosa fedoa (A)
Ruddy turnstone, Arenaria interpres
Red knot, Calidris canutus
Ruff, Calidris pugnax (A)
Stilt sandpiper, Calidris himantopus (A)
Curlew sandpiper, Calidris ferruginea (A)
Sanderling, Calidris alba
Dunlin, Calidris alpina (A)
Baird's sandpiper, Calidris bairdii (A)
Little stint, Calidris minuta (A)
Least sandpiper, Calidris minutilla
White-rumped sandpiper, Calidris fuscicollis (A)
Buff-breasted sandpiper, Calidris subruficollis (A)
Pectoral sandpiper, Calidris melanotos
Semipalmated sandpiper, Calidris pusilla
Western sandpiper, Calidris mauri
Short-billed dowitcher, Limnodromus griseus
Long-billed dowitcher, Limnodromus scolopaceus (A)
Jack snipe, Lymnocryptes minimus (A)
Wilson's snipe, Gallinago delicata (A)
Terek sandpiper, Xenus cinereus (A)
Spotted sandpiper, Actitis macularius
Solitary sandpiper, Tringa solitaria (A)
Lesser yellowlegs, Tringa flavipes
Willet, Tringa semipalmata (A)
Spotted redshank, Tringa erythropus (A)
Common greenshank, Tringa nebularia (A)
Greater yellowlegs, Tringa melanoleuca
Wood sandpiper, Tringa glareola (A)
Wilson's phalarope, Phalaropus tricolor (A)

Pratincoles and coursers
Order: CharadriiformesFamily: Glareolidae

The pratincoles have short legs, very long pointed wings, and long forked tails. Their most unusual feature for birds classed as waders is that they typically hunt their insect prey on the wing like swallows, although they can also feed on the ground. Their short bills are an adaptation to aerial feeding. Their flight is fast and graceful like a swallow or a tern, with many twists and turns to pursue their prey.

Collared pratincole, Glareola pratincola (A)

Skuas and jaegers
Order: CharadriiformesFamily: Stercorariidae

The family Stercorariidae are, in general, medium to large birds, typically with grey or brown plumage, often with white markings on the wings. They nest on the ground in temperate and arctic regions and are long-distance migrants.

Great skua, Stercorarius skua (A)
South polar skua, Stercorarius maccormicki (A)
Pomarine jaeger, Stercorarius pomarinus (A)
Parasitic jaeger, Stercorarius parasiticus (A)

Gulls, terns, and skimmers
Order: CharadriiformesFamily: Laridae

Laridae is a family of medium to large seabirds and includes gulls, kittiwakes, terns and skimmers. They are typically grey or white, often with black markings on the head or wings. They have stout, longish bills and webbed feet. Terns are a group of generally medium to large seabirds typically with grey or white plumage, often with black markings on the head. Most terns hunt fish by diving but some pick insects off the surface of fresh water. Terns are generally long-lived birds, with several species known to live in excess of 30 years.

Black-legged kittiwake, Rissa tridactyla (A)
Bonaparte's gull, Chroicocephalus philadelphia (A)
Gray-hooded gull, Chroicocephalus cirrocephalus (A)
Black-headed gull, Chroicocephalus ridibundus (A)
Little gull, Hydrocoloeus minutus (A)
Laughing gull, Leucophaeus atricilla
Franklin's gull, Leucophaeus pipixcan (A)
Ring-billed gull, Larus delawarensis (A)
Herring gull, Larus argentatus (A)
Yellow-legged gull, Larus michahellis (A)
Lesser black-backed gull, Larus fuscus (A)
Glaucous gull, Larus hyperboreus (A)
Great black-backed gull, Larus marinus (A)
Kelp gull, Larus dominicanus (A)
Brown noddy, Anous stolidus (A)
Black noddy, Anous minutus (A)
Sooty tern, Onychoprion fuscata
Bridled tern, Onychoprion anaethetus
Least tern, Sternula antillarum (A)
Gull-billed tern, Gelochelidon nilotica (A)
Caspian tern, Hydroprogne caspia (A)
Black tern, Chlidonias niger (A)
White-winged tern, Chlidonias leucopterus (A)
Whiskered tern, Chlidonias hybridus (A)
Roseate tern, Sterna dougallii (A)
Common tern, Sterna hirundo (A)
Arctic tern, Sterna paradisaea (A)
Royal tern, Thalasseus maxima
Sandwich tern, Thalasseus sandvicensis (A)
Black skimmer, Rynchops niger (A)

Tropicbirds
Order: PhaethontiformesFamily: Phaethontidae

Tropicbirds are slender white birds of tropical oceans, with exceptionally long central tail feathers. Their heads and long wings have black markings.

White-tailed tropicbird, Phaethon lepturus (A)
Red-billed tropicbird, Phaethon aethereus

Southern storm-petrels
Order: ProcellariiformesFamily: Oceanitidae

The storm-petrels are the smallest seabirds, relatives of the petrels, feeding on planktonic crustaceans and small fish picked from the surface, typically while hovering. The flight is fluttering and sometimes bat-like. Until 2018, this family's species were included with the other storm-petrels in family Hydrobatidae.

Wilson's storm-petrel, Oceanites oceanicus (A)

Northern storm-petrels
Order: ProcellariiformesFamily: Hydrobatidae

Though the members of this family are similar in many respects to the southern storm-petrels, including their general appearance and habits, there are enough genetic differences to warrant their placement in a separate family.

Leach's storm-petrel, Hydrobates leucorhous (A)

Shearwaters and petrels
Order: ProcellariiformesFamily: Procellariidae

The procellariids are the main group of medium-sized "true petrels", characterised by united nostrils with medium septum and a long outer functional primary.

Black-capped petrel, Pterodroma hasitata (A)
Cory's shearwater, Calonectris diomedea (A)
Great shearwater, Ardenna gravis (A)
Sooty shearwater, Ardenna griseus (A)
Manx shearwater, Puffinus puffinus (A)
Audubon's shearwater, Puffinus lherminieri

Frigatebirds
Order: SuliformesFamily: Fregatidae

Frigatebirds are large seabirds usually found over tropical oceans. They are large, black and white, or completely black, with long wings and deeply forked tails. The males have coloured inflatable throat pouches. They do not swim or walk and cannot take off from a flat surface. Having the largest wingspan-to-body-weight ratio of any bird, they are essentially aerial, able to stay aloft for more than a week.

Magnificent frigatebird, Fregata magnificens

Boobies and gannets
Order: SuliformesFamily: Sulidae

The sulids comprise the gannets and boobies. Both groups are medium to large coastal seabirds that plunge-dive for fish.

Masked booby, Sula dactylatra (A)
Brown booby, Sula leucogaster (A)
Red-footed booby, Sula sula (A)

Anhingas
Order: SuliformesFamily: Anhingidae

Anhingas are often called "snake-birds" because of their long thin neck, which gives a snake-like appearance when they swim with their bodies submerged. The males have black and dark-brown plumage, an erectile crest on the nape, and a larger bill than the female. The females have much paler plumage especially on the neck and underparts. The darters have completely webbed feet and their legs are short and set far back on the body. Their plumage is somewhat permeable, like that of cormorants, and they spread their wings to dry after diving.

Anhinga, Anhinga anhinga

Pelicans
Order: PelecaniformesFamily: Pelecanidae

Pelicans are large water birds with a distinctive pouch under their beak. As with other members of the order Pelecaniformes, they have webbed feet with four toes.

Brown pelican, Pelecanus occidentalis (A)

Herons, egrets, and bitterns
Order: PelecaniformesFamily: Ardeidae

The family Ardeidae contains the bitterns, herons, and egrets. Herons and egrets are medium to large wading birds with long necks and legs. Bitterns tend to be shorter necked and more wary. Members of Ardeidae fly with their necks retracted, unlike other long-necked birds such as storks, ibises and spoonbills.

American bittern, Botaurus lentiginosus (A)
Little bittern, Ixobrychus minutus (A)
Least bittern, Ixobrychus exilis (A)
Great blue heron, Ardea herodias
Gray heron, Ardea cinerea (A)
Purple heron, Ardea purpurea (A)
Great egret, Ardea alba
Little egret, Egretta garzetta
Western reef-heron, Egretta gularis (A)
Snowy egret, Egretta thula
Little blue heron, Egretta caerulea
Tricolored heron, Egretta tricolor (A)
Cattle egret, Bubulcus ibis
Squacco heron, Ardeola ralloides (A)
Green heron, Butorides virescens
Striated heron, Butorides striata (A)
Black-crowned night-heron, Nycticorax nycticorax
Yellow-crowned night-heron, Nyctanassa violacea (A)

Ibises and spoonbills
Order: PelecaniformesFamily: Threskiornithidae

Threskiornithidae is a family of large terrestrial and wading birds which includes the ibises and spoonbills. They have long, broad wings with 11 primary and about 20 secondary feathers. They are strong fliers and despite their size and weight, very capable soarers.

White ibis, Eudocimus albus (A)
Glossy ibis, Plegadis falcinellus (A)
Eurasian spoonbill, Platalea leucorodia (A)

Osprey
Order: AccipitriformesFamily: Pandionidae

The family Pandionidae contains only one species, the osprey. The osprey is a medium-large raptor which is a specialist fish-eater with a worldwide distribution.

Osprey, Pandion haliaetus

Hawks, eagles, and kites
Order: AccipitriformesFamily: Accipitridae

Accipitridae is a family of birds of prey, which includes hawks, eagles, kites, harriers, and Old World vultures. These birds have powerful hooked beaks for tearing flesh from their prey, strong legs, powerful talons, and keen eyesight.

Northern harrier, Circus hudsonius (A)
Eurasian marsh-harrier, Circus aeruginosus (A)
Black kite, Milvus migrans (A)  
Snail kite, Rostrhamus sociabilis (A)
Broad-winged hawk, Buteo platypterus
Red-tailed hawk, Buteo jamaicensis (Ex)

Owls
Order: StrigiformesFamily: Strigidae

The typical owls are small to large solitary nocturnal birds of prey. They have large forward-facing eyes and ears, a hawk-like beak, and a conspicuous circle of feathers around each eye called a facial disk.

Short-eared owl, Asio flammeus (A)

Kingfishers
Order: CoraciiformesFamily: Alcedinidae

Kingfishers are medium-sized birds with large heads, long pointed bills, short legs, and stubby tails.

Ringed kingfisher, Megaceryle torquata (A)
Belted kingfisher, Megaceryle alcyon

Falcons and caracaras
Order: FalconiformesFamily: Falconidae

Falconidae is a family of diurnal birds of prey. They differ from hawks, eagles, and kites in that they kill with their beaks instead of their talons.

American kestrel, Falco sparverius (A)
Merlin, Falco columbarius
Bat falcon, Falco rufigularis (A)
Peregrine falcon, Falco peregrinus

New World and African parrots
Order: PsittaciformesFamily: Psittacidae

Parrots are small to large birds with a characteristic curved beak. Their upper mandibles have slight mobility in the joint with the skull and they have a generally erect stance. All parrots are zygodactyl, having the four toes on each foot placed two at the front and two to the back.

Orange-winged parrot, Amazona amazonica (I)
Green-rumped parrotlet, Forpus passerinus (I) (Ex)

Old World parrots
Order: PsittaciformesFamily: Psittaculidae

Characteristic features of parrots include a strong curved bill, an upright stance, strong legs, and clawed zygodactyl feet. Many parrots are vividly coloured, and some are multi-coloured. Old World parrots are found from Africa east across south and southeast Asia and Oceania to Australia and New Zealand.

Rose-ringed parakeet, Psittacula krameri (I)
Budgerigar, Melopsittacus undulatus (I) (Ex)

Tyrant flycatchers
Order: PasseriformesFamily: Tyrannidae

Tyrant flycatchers are passerine birds which occur throughout North and South America. They superficially resemble the Old World flycatchers, but are more robust and have stronger bills. They do not have the sophisticated vocal capabilities of the songbirds. Most, but not all, have plain colouring. As the name implies, most are insectivorous.

Caribbean elaenia, Elaenia martinica
Great kiskadee, Pitangus sulphuratus (A)
Gray kingbird, Tyrannus dominicensis
Fork-tailed flycatcher, Tyrannus savana (A)
Eastern wood-pewee, Contopus virens (A)
Acadian flycatcher, Empidonax virescens (A)

Vireos, shrike-babblers, and erpornis
Order: PasseriformesFamily: Vireonidae

The vireos are a group of small to medium-sized passerine birds. They are typically greenish in colour and resemble New World warblers apart from their heavier bills.

Yellow-throated vireo, Vireo flavifrons (A)
Red-eyed vireo, Vireo olivaceus
Black-whiskered vireo, Vireo altiloquus

Swallows
Order: PasseriformesFamily: Hirundinidae

The family Hirundinidae is adapted to aerial feeding. They have a slender streamlined body, long pointed wings, and a short bill with a wide gape. The feet are adapted to perching rather than walking, and the front toes are partially joined at the base.

Bank swallow, Riparia riparia
Tree swallow, Tachycineta bicolor (A)  
Northern rough-winged swallow, Stelgidopteryx serripennis (A)  
Cuban martin, Progne cryptoleuca (A) 
Caribbean martin, Progne dominicensis
Barn swallow, Hirundo rustica
Common house-martin, Delichon urbicum (A)
Cliff swallow, Petrochelidon pyrrhonota (A)

Wrens
Order: PasseriformesFamily: Troglodytidae

The wrens are mainly small and inconspicuous except for their loud songs. These birds have short wings and thin down-turned bills. Several species often hold their tails upright. All are insectivorous.

House wren, Troglodytes aedon (A)

Mockingbirds and thrashers
Order: PasseriformesFamily: Mimidae

The mimids are a family of passerine birds that includes thrashers, mockingbirds, tremblers, and the New World catbirds. These birds are notable for their vocalizations, especially their ability to mimic a wide variety of birds and other sounds heard outdoors. Their colouring tends towards dull-greys and browns.

Scaly-breasted thrasher, Allenia fusca (Ex)
Pearly-eyed thrasher, Margarops fuscatus (A)
Tropical mockingbird, Mimus gilvus (A)  
Northern mockingbird, Mimus polyglottos (Ex)

Starlings
Order: PasseriformesFamily: Sturnidae

Starlings are small to medium-sized passerine birds. Their flight is strong and direct and they are very gregarious. Their preferred habitat is fairly open country. They eat insects and fruit. Plumage is typically dark with a metallic sheen.

European starling, Sturnus vulgaris (I)

Thrushes and allies
Order: PasseriformesFamily: Turdidae

The thrushes are a group of passerine birds that occur mainly in the Old World. They are plump, soft plumaged, small to medium-sized insectivores or sometimes omnivores, often feeding on the ground. Many have attractive songs.

Gray-cheeked thrush, Catharus minimus (A)
Swainson's thrush, Catharus ustulatus (A)
Spectacled thrush, Turdus nudigenis (Ex)

Old World flycatchers
Order: PasseriformesFamily: Muscicapidae

Old World flycatchers are a large group of small passerine birds native to the Old World. They are mainly small arboreal insectivores. The appearance of these birds is highly varied, but they mostly have weak songs and harsh calls.

Northern wheatear, Oenanthe oenanthe (A)

Weavers and allies
Order: PasseriformesFamily: Ploceidae

The weavers are small passerine birds related to the finches. They are seed-eating birds with rounded conical bills. The males of many species are brightly coloured, usually in red or yellow and black; some species show variation in colour only in the breeding season.

Northern red bishop, Euplectes franciscanus (I) (A)
Yellow-crowned bishop, Euplectes afer (I) (A)

Old World sparrows
Order: PasseriformesFamily: Passeridae

Sparrows are small passerine birds. In general, sparrows tend to be small, plump, brown or grey birds with short tails and short powerful beaks. Sparrows are seed eaters, but they also consume small insects.

House sparrow, Passer domesticus (I)

Wagtails and pipits
Order: PasseriformesFamily: Motacillidae

Motacillidae is a family of small passerine birds with medium to long tails. They include the wagtails, longclaw,s and pipits. They are slender ground-feeding insectivores of open country.

White wagtail, Motacilla alba (A)

Troupials and allies
Order: PasseriformesFamily: Icteridae

The icterids are a group of small to medium-sized, often colourful, passerine birds restricted to the New World and include the grackles, New World blackbirds, and New World orioles. Most species have black as the predominant plumage colour, often enlivened by yellow, orange, or red.

Bobolink, Dolichonyx oryzivorus (A)
Baltimore oriole, Icterus galbula (A)
Shiny cowbird, Molothrus bonariensis
Giant cowbird, Molothrus oryzivorus (A) 
Carib grackle, Quiscalus lugubris
Yellow-hooded blackbird, Chrysomus icterocephalus (A)

New World warblers
Order: PasseriformesFamily: Parulidae

The New World warblers are a group of small, often colourful, passerine birds restricted to the New World. Most are arboreal, but some are terrestrial. Most members of this family are insectivores.

Ovenbird, Seiurus aurocapilla (A)
Worm-eating warbler, Helmitheros vermivorum (A)
Louisiana waterthrush, Parkesia motacilla (A)
Northern waterthrush, Parkesia noveboracensis
Golden-winged warbler, Vermivora chrysoptera (A)
Black-and-white warbler, Mniotilta varia (A)
Prothonotary warbler, Protonotaria citrea
Tennessee warbler, Leiothlypis peregrina (A)
Connecticut warbler, Oporornis agilis (A)
Kentucky warbler, Geothlypis formosa (A)
Hooded warbler, Setophaga citrina (A)
American redstart, Setophaga ruticilla
Cape May warbler, Setophaga tigrina (A)
Cerulean warbler, Setophaga cerulea (A)
Northern parula, Setophaga americana (A)
Magnolia warbler, Setophaga magnolia (A)
Bay-breasted warbler, Setophaga castanea (A)
Blackburnian warbler, Setophaga fusca (A)
Yellow warbler, Setophaga petechia
Chestnut-sided warbler, Setophaga pensylvanica (A)
Blackpoll warbler, Setophaga striata (A)
Black-throated blue warbler, Setophaga caerulescens (A)
Palm warbler, Setophaga palmarum (A)
Yellow-rumped warbler, Setophaga coronata (A)
Yellow-throated warbler, Setophaga dominica (A)
Prairie warbler, Setophaga discolor (A)
Black-throated green warbler, Setophaga virens (A)
Canada warbler, Cardellina canadensis (A)

Cardinals and allies
Order: PasseriformesFamily: Cardinalidae

The cardinals are a family of robust, seed-eating birds with strong bills. They are typically associated with open woodland. The sexes usually have distinct plumages.

Summer tanager, Piranga rubra (A)
Scarlet tanager, Piranga olivacea (A)
Northern cardinal, Cardinalis cardinalis (I) (Ex)
Rose-breasted grosbeak, Pheucticus ludovicianus (A)
Blue grosbeak, Passerina caerulea (A)
Indigo bunting, Passerina cyanea (A)
Dickcissel, Spiza americana (A)

Tanagers and allies
Order: PasseriformesFamily: Thraupidae

The tanagers are a large group of small to medium-sized passerine birds restricted to the New World, mainly in the tropics. Many species are brightly coloured. As a family they are omnivorous, but individual species specialize in eating fruits, seeds, insects, or other types of food.

Grassland yellow-finch, Sicalis luteola
Bananaquit, Coereba flaveola
Barbados bullfinch, Loxigilla barbadensis (E)
Black-faced grassquit, Melanospiza bicolor

References

See also
List of birds
Lists of birds by region

 
Birds
Barbados